The Prodigal Son: a dramatic renarration written by Norwegian author and philosopher Peter Wessel Zapffe (1899–1990) in 1951, is a dramatized representation of the life of Jesus, named Immanuel in Zapffe's play.

Summary

The play is a dramatic biography of Jesus, influenced by the philosophical thoughts represented in the essay Den sidste Messias (en. The Last Messiah) published in 1933 and Zapffe's philosophical treatise, Om det tragiske (en. On the Tragic) published in 1941. Zapffe asserts that Jesus, like most people in the past and present, misinterpreted what it means to be human on this earth. He intentionally solicited the betrayal himself in order to fulfill the Messianic prophecies, through which he wanted to apprehend what he considered his birthright: the throne of King Herod. Zapffe thought Jesus was fully convinced he was the only living son of Herod Antipas, hence his only heir (except for Salomé). Judas is a central character in the play, being Jesus' closest friend from childhood.

The play has never been produced because of its extensive requirements, including entire cities with massive buildings and numerous extras.

Methodology

In the foreword, Zapffe explains that the dramatic character of the material he gathered made him decide that a play was the best solution. Zapffe is said to have considered Jesus to be western culture's most tragic character, according to his findings presented in his treatise On the tragic (1941) and its definition of the objectively tragical.

His findings were later presented in his short biography of Jesus called Rikets hemmelighet (en. The Secret of the Kingdom) of 1985.

See also
Parable of the Prodigal Son

1951 plays
Norwegian plays
Christian plays
Plays set in the 1st century